Gower Creek is a stream in the U.S. state of Iowa. It is a tributary to the Cedar River.

Gower Creek was named after James and Borredell Gower, pioneer settlers.

References

Rivers of Cedar County, Iowa
Rivers of Johnson County, Iowa
Rivers of Iowa